Paul R. Takac Jr. (born ) is an American politician who is currently a Democratic member of the Pennsylvania House of Representatives, representing the 82nd District since 2023.

Early life and education
Takac and his sister were born into a family where both their mother and father were employed. When he was 10 years old, Takac's mother died of cancer, and his father subsequently lost his job and struggled with addiction. Through his father's disability pension, Takac was able to get an education. 

Takac graduated from Orchard Park High School in 1983. He earned a Bachelor of arts degree from State University of New York at Buffalo in 1987 and a Master of Arts from Southern Methodist University in 1991. Takac earned an M.S. degree from Maryland University of Integrative Health in 2018.

Political career
Prior to his run for Pennsylvania State Representative, Takac was a member of the College Township Council. His term started in January of 2020. He also chaired the Spring Creek Watershed Commission and the Centre Region Council of Government's Public Safety Committee.

In 2022, Takac ran for the newly redrawn 82nd District.  The race was seen as competitive, but Takac ultimately won, defeating Republican candidate, Justin Behrens.

Personal life
For over twenty years, Takac and his wife, Regan W., have lived in Happy Valley, Pennsylvania, where they raised their three children.

Electoral history

|-
! style="background-color: #800080; width: 8px;" |
| style="width: 130px" | Democratic/Republican
|               | D. Richard Francke
| align="right" | 1,794
| align="right" | 25.28
|-

Refernces

Living people
Democratic Party members of the Pennsylvania House of Representatives
21st-century American politicians